The Columbus Monument is a  column installed at the center of Manhattan's Columbus Circle in the U.S. state of New York. The monument was created by Italian sculptor Gaetano Russo.

Description
The monument consists of a  marble statue of Christopher Columbus atop a  granite rostral column placed on a four-stepped granite pedestal. The column is decorated with bronze projections representing Columbus' ships: the Niña, the Pinta, and the Santa María; although actually they are depicted as Roman galleys (after the rostral column classical tradition) instead of caravels. Its pedestal features an angel holding a globe.

History
The monument was one of three planned as part of the city's 1892 commemoration of the 400th anniversary of Columbus' landing in the Americas. Originally, the monument was planned to be located in Bowling Green or somewhere else in lower Manhattan. By the time Russo's plan was decided upon in 1890, a commission of Italian businessmen from around the United States had contributed $12,000 of the $20,000 needed to build the statue (equivalent to $ of the $ in cost in current dollars). The statue was constructed with funds raised by Il Progresso, a New York City-based Italian-language newspaper.

Russo created parts of the Columbus Column in his Rome studio and in other workshops in Italy; the bronze elements were cast in the Nelli Foundry. The completed column was shipped to the United States in September 1892 to be placed within the "circle at Fifty-ninth Street and Eighth Avenue". Once the statue arrived in Manhattan, it was quickly transported to the circle.  The monument was officially unveiled with a ceremony on October 13, 1892, as part of the 400th anniversary celebration.

During the construction of the New York City Subway's Eighth Avenue Line underneath the circle in the late 1920s and early 1930s, the Columbus statue was shored up with temporary supports. Even so, the statue was shifted two inches north from its original position, and the top of the statue tilted . As a result, the statue was repaired and cleaned in 1934. The monument received some retouching in 1992 to commemorate the 500th anniversary of Columbus's voyage, and in turn, the monument's own 100th anniversary. It was also rededicated in that same year.

In 2012, the statue was used as the centerpiece of an interactive art installation by Tatzu Nishi entitled Discovering Columbus. The Public Art Fund described the project as follows:Nishi’s project re-imagines the colossal 13-foot-tall statue of Columbus standing in a fully furnished, modern living room. Featuring tables, chairs, couch, rug, and flat-screen television, the décor reflects the artist’s interpretation of contemporary New York style. He even designed wallpaper inspired by memories of American popular culture, having watched Hollywood movies and television as a child in Japan. Discovering Columbus offers both a unique perspective on a historical monument and a surreal experience of the sculpture in a new context. Allowing us to take a journey up six flights of stairs to a fictional living room, Tatzu Nishi invites us to discover for ourselves where the imagination may lead.Amid the 2017 monument controversies in the United States, an issue arose over the statue due to criticism of Columbus's mistreatment of the native people on Hispaniola. In August of that year, the far-right Unite the Right rally in Charlottesville, Virginia, had resulted in one death and several injuries. Following that rally, Mayor Bill de Blasio commissioned a "90-day review" of possibly "hateful" monuments across the city to determine if any of them, including the Columbus Column, warranted either removal or recontextualization (e.g. by explanatory plaques). Although calls to remove the monument were supported by those criticizing Columbus's actions, the proposed removal was opposed by some sectors of the city's Italian American community and Columbus Day Parade organizers. After two instances of vandalism in September 2017, including one incident where the statue was defaced with red paint, full-time security measures were put around the column ahead of the year's parade.

On September 20, 2018, in a unanimous decision, the New York State Board of Historic Preservation voted to place the monument on the state historic register and nominate it to the National Register of Historic Places (NRHP), due to its significance. Two months later the National Park Service added the monument to the NRHP.

See also
 List of monuments and memorials to Christopher Columbus
 National Register of Historic Places listings in Manhattan from 14th to 59th Streets

References

External links
 

1892 establishments in New York (state)
1892 sculptures
Angels in art
Bronze sculptures in Manhattan
Columbus Circle
Granite sculptures in New York City
Marble sculptures in New York City
Monumental columns in the United States
Monuments and memorials on the National Register of Historic Places in New York City
Monuments and memorials to Christopher Columbus
National Register of Historic Places in Manhattan
Outdoor sculptures in Manhattan
Sculptures of men in New York City
Ships in art
Statues in New York City
Statues of Christopher Columbus
Vandalized works of art in New York City